Candas Jane Dorsey (born November 16, 1952) is a Canadian poet and science fiction novelist who resides in her hometown of Edmonton, Alberta. Dorsey became a writer from an early age and works across genre boundaries, writing poetry, fiction, mainstream and speculative, short and long form, arts journalism and arts advocacy. Dorsey has also written television and stage scripts, magazine and newspaper articles, and reviews.

Dorsey currently teaches and holds workshops and readings. She has served on the executive board of the Writers' Guild of Alberta and is a founder of SF Canada. In 1998, Dorsey received the Prix Aurora Award.

Dorsey was editor-in-chief of The Books Collective (River, Slipstream and Tesseract Books) from 1992 through 2005.

Bibliography 
Results of the Ring Toss - 1976
Hardwired Angel - 1987
Machine Sex and Other Stories - 1988
Leaving Marks - 1992
Black Wine - 1997 (winner, James Tiptree, Jr. Award, Crawford Award, Prix Aurora Awards)
Vanilla and Other Stories - 2000
A Paradigm of Earth - 2001
Ice & Other Stories - 2018

Epitome Apartments series 
The Adventures of Isabel: A Postmodern Mystery, By the Numbers - 2020
What's the Matter with Mary Jane?  - 2021

References

External links
 

1952 births
Living people
Bisexual women
Canadian science fiction writers
Cyberpunk writers
Canadian LGBT novelists
Canadian women novelists
Science fiction editors
Writers from Edmonton
Women science fiction and fantasy writers
Canadian speculative fiction publishers (people)
Canadian speculative fiction editors
Canadian LGBT poets
20th-century Canadian novelists
20th-century Canadian poets
20th-century Canadian non-fiction writers
20th-century Canadian women writers
21st-century Canadian novelists
21st-century Canadian poets
21st-century Canadian non-fiction writers
21st-century Canadian women writers
21st-century Canadian LGBT people
Canadian bisexual writers
Bisexual novelists